Garth C. Thomas (born November 26, 1963) is a former American football guard who played one season with the Seattle Seahawks of the National Football League. He previously played football at Redmond High School and the University of Washington He currently resides in Bellevue, Washington with his wife Shelley..

References

External links
Career statistics at Pro-Football-Reference and The Football Database

Living people
Sportspeople from Bellevue, Washington
Washington Huskies football players
Seattle Seahawks players
1963 births
National Football League replacement players